Margaret Leibovici OBE (née Kelly; 24 June 1910 – 11 September 2004), known as Miss Bluebell, was an Irish dancer who was the founder of the Bluebell Girls dance troupe.

Biography
Margaret Kelly was born in Dublin on 24 June 1910 at the Rotunda Hospital. She never knew her parents. An Irish priest entrusted her to Mary Murphy, a spinster who worked at home as a dressmaker. In 1916, following the Easter uprising, both moved to Liverpool, where, on the direction of a doctor, Kelly was registered in a dance class to strengthen her frail legs. Quickly, it appeared that she had a great talent.

Career 
At the age of 14, Kelly left school and joined a Scottish dance troupe called the Hot Jocks. Nine months later, she was contracted to the Scala in Berlin by noted producer Alfred Jackson, manager of the Jackson Girls. Kelly remained at the Scala for 5 years.

Beginning in 1930, Kelly danced in Paris for the Folies Bergère. In 1932, when she was 22, she created her own troupe there called the Bluebell Girls.

In 1939, she married Marcel Leibovici (1904–1961), a stateless Romanian Jew, pianist and composer at the Folies Bergère. During the Second World War, they had two sons: Patrick (1939) and Francis (1941). Following the German occupation of Paris in 1940, Kelly, now pregnant with Francis, was arrested by the French police and interned in Besançon. She was freed from custody by the Irish chargé d'affaires, Count O'Kelly. However, in 1942, Marcel was arrested and deported to the internment camp of Gurs. The French Resistance helped him flee from Gurs and return to Paris, where he was hidden by his wife opposite the Prefecture of Police building until the Liberation. During this time, Kelly ensured him food and security at the risk of her life. Suspected of protecting her husband, she was interrogated by the Gestapo, but in spite of intense questioning, Kellysucceeded in not divulging his whereabouts. François Truffaut's film The Last Metro is inspired by this event in the life of Margaret Kelly and her husband.

After the war, Kelly began a fruitful collaboration with Donn Arden, the American choreographer and producer, to produce shows at the Paris Lido. While beginning with a modest contract in 1947, the Bluebell Girls quickly became the sole stars of the Lido shows and gained notoriety locally and nationally. Their shows were different from the others; Bluebell had an inventory of the tallest and most beautiful dancers who, with their costumes and high heels, towered over everybody on stage. Donn Arden's shows differentiated themselves from the others by the mixture of movement, colour, music and light in a kaleidoscope of impetuous rhythm. By the end of the 1950s, the Bluebell Girls had become an internationally recognized organization. Their base in Paris was supplemented by what had become permanent troupes in Las Vegas, other nations in Europe, Africa, as well as eastern Asia.

From 1947, Marcel Leibovici had entered in full partnership with his wife, managing the orchestral, business and financial side of her operation and, thanks to his considerable flair, had made the Bluebell Girls one of the most celebrated and prestigious dancing troupes in the world.  In 1961, Marcel Leibovici was killed in a car crash, having fallen asleep at the wheel, and Kelly then had to take over all his business responsibilities. The disappearance of the motive force behind its commercial success could have marked the end of the Bluebell Girls. Nevertheless, Margaret became wholly responsible for their four children: Patrick, Francis, Florence and Jean-Paul, and kept the Bluebell's programme in steady operation, even increasing the number of  troupes and activities by continually adding innovative new elements and artists. One of her most noteworthy innovations was the introduction of the "topless" dancer in 1970.

Later life 
In 1986 Kelly went into semi-retirement and left the Paris Lido, but she continued her global activities, particularly in Las Vegas with the MGM Grand Hotel. The Paris Lido bought her brand name Bluebell Girls, allowing the name to be continued in shows.

Awards and tributes 

Kelly was decorated Officer of the Order of the British Empire, Chevalier of the Legion of Honour for 72 years of professional activity as maîtresse de ballet, Chevalier des Arts et Lettres and Chevalier de l'Ordre National du Mérite.

In 1986 the BBC broadcast a major drama series called Bluebell produced by Richard Bates and George Perry who wrote her authorized biography. Carolyn Pickles played her part.

In 1987, the British sculptor Doreen Kern realized Kelly's life-size bronze portrait bust, it was placed on her tomb (and stolen on 18 July 2008)..

On June 24, 2010, Bluebell Girls belonging to four generations and coming from around the world celebrated the first centenary of the birth of Kelly by meeting at the Lido de Paris. At the end of the show, they went on the stage and joined the Bluebell Girls who had performed.

Within the framework of its mission to present the history of entertainment, the University of Nevada in Las Vegas (UNLV) is paying a permanent tribute to Miss Bluebell by showing photographs of her in its on-line exhibit of photos SHOWGIRLS and in the famous Donn Arden Special Collection, thus reuniting for ever the two partners who played such a signature role in the history of show business and contributed so much to the legend of the Bluebell Girls.

Last years
In 1996, Kelly was placed under French guardianship.

Kelly is buried in the Montmartre Cemetery. Her son Jean-Paul, who died in 1996, is interred with her.

References

French female dancers
Dancers from Dublin (city)
Irish female dancers
Burials at Montmartre Cemetery
Chevaliers of the Légion d'honneur
1910 births
2004 deaths
20th-century Irish writers
Irish emigrants to France
Officers of the Order of the British Empire
20th-century French women